Heavy Nova is the ninth studio album by English singer Robert Palmer, released in 1988. His first album for EMI Records after a 15-year association with Island Records, it followed Palmer's very successful album Riptide (1985).

Background
The name Heavy Nova derives from Palmer's love of both heavy metal and bossa nova rhythms.
The album continued Palmer's popularity with the single "Simply Irresistible", which spent three weeks at No. 1 on the Billboard Mainstream Rock Tracks chart in the United States.

The album peaked at No. 13 in the US, No. 17 in the UK and No. 15 in The Netherlands. The album was certified Platinum by RIAA in November 1988 and Gold by BPI in November 1988. It remains Palmer's second most successful album worldwide, behind his 1985 album Riptide.

Recording
The album was recorded at Logic Studios in Milan, Italy and Compass Point Studios in The Bahamas.

Track listing
All tracks written by Robert Palmer, except where noted.

Personnel 
 Robert Palmer – lead and backing vocals
 William Bryant – keyboards
 Misha Schneider – keyboards
 Jeff Bova – additional keyboards
 Richard Gibbs – additional keyboards
 Garth Hudson – accordion, additional keyboards
 Tom "T-Bone" Wolk – accordion
 Eddie Martinez – guitar
 Dennis Budimir – additional guitar
 John Grey – additional guitar, additional percussion
 Frank Blair – bass 
 Barry "Sun John" Johnson – additional bass 
 Dony Wynn – drums
 Ricky Fataar – additional drums
 Dom Um Romão – percussion, additional backing vocals
 Robyn Lobe – additional percussion
 Chuck Findley – trumpet
 Luka Belak – violin
 Clare Fischer – strings
 Rick Danko – additional backing vocals
 B.J. Nelson – additional backing vocals

Production 
 Robert Palmer – producer, art direction
 David Harper – executive producer
 Richard Cobble – production coordinator 
 Tim Kramer – engineer
 Bookie Epsie – assistant engineer 
 Scott Forman – assistant engineer 
 Roy Sweeting – assistant engineer 
 Eric Thorngren – mixing 
 Henry Marquez – design
 Terence Donovan – photography 
 Tony Baglio – management 
 Pino Pischetola – management

Charts

Weekly charts

Year-end charts

Certifications

See also
 List of albums released in 1988

References

External links

1988 albums
Robert Palmer (singer) albums
EMI Records albums
Albums produced by Robert Palmer (singer)